Richard Elmer "Joey" Dorsey (born December 16, 1983) is an American professional basketball player for APOP Paphos B.C. of the Cyprus Basketball Division A. He played college basketball for the University of Memphis.

College career
During both his sophomore and junior years on the team, the Tigers ended their season in the NCAA tournament's Elite Eight.

However, during his senior year Dorsey led the Memphis Tigers to the 2008 NCAA Men's Division I Basketball Tournament championship game with Derrick Rose and Chris Douglas-Roberts. The Tigers fell to Kansas 75–68 in overtime.

Professional career

Houston Rockets
Dorsey was chosen as the 33rd overall pick in the 2008 NBA draft by the Portland Trail Blazers. After the draft, he was traded to the Houston Rockets in exchange for the draft rights to the 25th pick, Nicolas Batum. In the 2008–09 NBA season, Dorsey played in 3 games, scoring a total of 2 points, grabbing one rebound, and making one assist.

The Rockets assigned Dorsey to the Rio Grande Valley Vipers of the NBA Development League. On February 5, 2010, after previously being called back up from the NBDL, Dorsey played a career-high 19 minutes and grabbed 12 rebounds.

Sacramento Kings / Toronto Raptors
On February 18, 2010, Dorsey was traded to the Sacramento Kings in a three team deal that also moved the Rockets' Tracy McGrady to the New York Knicks. On March 28, 2010, he was waived by the Kings.

On April 4, 2010, Dorsey was signed to a non-guaranteed contract by the Raptors.

Europe
In September 2011, Dorsey signed a one-year deal with the Spanish League club Caja Laboral. On January 10, 2012, he parted ways with Caja Laboral. The next day, he signed with the Greek League club Olympiacos for the rest of the season. With Olympiacos, he won the 2011–12 EuroLeague championship, as well as the 2011–12 Greek League championship. In August 2012, he re-signed with Olympiacos on a two-year deal. On September 12, 2012, during a preseason exhibition game against Dinamo Sassari, Dorsey ended up shattering a backboard, with around two minutes left in the fourth quarter.

On November 7, 2012, Dorsey was released by Olympiacos, ending their relationship two weeks after he criticized the organization, and he stopped playing with the team. On November 22, 2012, he signed with Turkish club Royal Halı Gaziantep for the rest of the 2012–13 Turkish Basketball League season.

On July 17, 2013, Dorsey signed a one-year deal (with the option of a second) with the Spanish club FC Barcelona.

Return to the NBA
On July 19, 2014, Dorsey signed with the Houston Rockets. On January 21, 2015, he had a season-best game with seven points and 12 rebounds in a loss to the Golden State Warriors.

On July 20, 2015, the Rockets traded Dorsey, Nick Johnson, Kostas Papanikolaou, Pablo Prigioni, a 2016 first round draft pick, and cash considerations to the Denver Nuggets in exchange for Ty Lawson and a 2017 second round draft pick. On August 18, 2015, he was waived by the Nuggets in a buyout deal.

Return to Europe
On August 29, 2015, Dorsey signed a one-year, $650,000 net income contract with Turkish club Galatasaray. On February 19, 2016, he left Galatasaray, and returned to his former club, FC Barcelona, for the rest of the season.

On August 17, 2016, Dorsey signed a two-year contract extension with Barcelona. On January 18, 2017, he was released from the team due to disciplinary reasons.

On February 13, 2017, Dorsey signed with Turkish Super League club Best Balıkesir for the rest of the  2016–17 BSL season.

On November 2, 2018, Dorsey returned to Greek Basket League after six years, penning a deal with Panionios B.C. until the end of the 2018–19 season. Dorsey made 20 appearances and averaged 9 points and 8.8 rebounds in 22 minutes per game, helping Panionios to get some crucial victories in order to avoid relegation.

On November 29, 2019, he has signed with Syntainics MBC of the Basketball Bundesliga. Dorsey parted ways with the team on July 21, 2020. He signed with Apollon Limassol of the Cypriot League on September 10. On September 4, 2021, Dorsey signed with APOP Paphos B.C. of the Cyprus Basketball Division A.

Awards and accomplishments

College career
 Conference USA All-Freshman Team: (2004–05)
 Conference USA All-Tournament Team: (2006)
 All-Conference USA First-Team: (2006–07)
 Conference USA All-Defensive Team: (2006–07)
 Conference USA Defensive Player of the Year: (2006–07)
 Conference USA All-Tournament Team: (2007)

Professional career
 EuroLeague Champion: (2012)
 Greek League Champion: (2012)
 Greek League Best Defender: (2012)
BSL Rebounds Leader (2013)

Career statistics

NBA

Regular season

|-
| align="left" | 
| align="left" | Houston
| 3 || 0 || 2.0 || .500 || .000 || .000 || .3 || .3 || .0 || .0 || .7
|-
| align="left" | 
| align="left" | Houston
| 7 || 0 || 7.7 || .455 || .000 || .500 || 3.6 || .3 || .3 || .1 || 1.6
|-
| align="left" | 
| align="left" | Sacramento
| 8 || 0 || 6.5 || .444 || .000 || .400 || 2.3 || .0 || .1 || .1 || 1.5
|-
| align="left" | 
| align="left" | Toronto
| 43 || 9 || 12.1 || .525 || .000 || .477 || 4.4 || .6 || .6 || .4 || 3.1
|-
| align="left" | 
| align="left" | Houston
| 69 || 17 || 12.4 || .552 || .000 || .289 || 4.0 || .4 || .6 || .4 || 2.7
|- class="sortbottom"
| style="text-align:center;" colspan="2"| Career
| 130 || 26 || 11.5 || .534 || .000 || .375 || 3.9 || .4 || .5 || .3 || 2.6

Playoffs

|-
| align="left" | 2015
| align="left" | Houston
| 6 || 0 || 2.2 || .000 || – || .500 || .7 || .3 || .0 || .0 || .2

Personal life 
Joey is the father of one child in the United States.  Dorsey is the son of Charlene Dorsey. He has a younger sister named Candice.

See also

 List of NCAA Division I men's basketball players with 145 games played

References

External links

 Joey Dorsey at acb.com 
 Joey Dorsey at espn.com
 Joey Dorsey at euroleague.net
 Joey Dorsey at fiba.com
 Joey Dorsey at tblstat.net

1983 births
Living people
African-American basketball players
American expatriate basketball people in Canada
American expatriate basketball people in Greece
American expatriate basketball people in Spain
American expatriate basketball people in Turkey
American men's basketball players
Basketball players at the 2007 Pan American Games
Basketball players from Baltimore
Best Balıkesir B.K. players
Centers (basketball)
FC Barcelona Bàsquet players
Galatasaray S.K. (men's basketball) players
Gaziantep Basketbol players
Houston Rockets players
Liga ACB players
Memphis Tigers men's basketball players
Olympiacos B.C. players
Panionios B.C. players
Portland Trail Blazers draft picks
Power forwards (basketball)
Rio Grande Valley Vipers players
Sacramento Kings players
Saski Baskonia players
Toronto Raptors players
Pan American Games competitors for the United States
21st-century African-American sportspeople
20th-century African-American people